The 1977 Bandy World Championship was the tenth Bandy World Championship and was contested between four men's bandy playing nations. The championship was played in Norway from 23–30 January 1977. The Soviet Union became champions.

Participants

Premier tour
 23 January
 Norway – Finland 1–5
 Soviet Union – Sweden 2–3
 24 January
 Norway – Sweden 3–1
 Soviet Union – Finland 4–3
 26 January
 Finland – Sweden 2–1
 Soviet Union – Norway 8–1
 27 January
 Norway – Sweden 2–6
 Soviet Union – Finland 8–3
 29 January
 Finland – Sweden 3–9
 Soviet Union – Norway 6–1
 30 January
 Norway – Finland 4–2
 Soviet Union – Sweden 3–2

References

1977
1977 in bandy
1977 in Soviet sport
International bandy competitions hosted by Norway
January 1977 sports events in Europe